Heaven on My Mind may refer to:
Heaven on My Mind (film)
"Heaven on My Mind" (song)